Burckhardt is a lunar impact crater that is located in the northeast part of the Moon. It lies between the craters Geminus just to the north and Cleomedes to the south.

Burckhardt lies across two slightly smaller craters on opposite sides, producing a triple-crater formation. Burckhardt E is overlaid by the southwest quadrant of Burckhardt, while Burckhardt F is overlaid by the northwest quadrant. The rim of Burckhardt is generally circular but somewhat irregular in form. There is a central rise near the midpoint of the crater floor.

Satellite craters
By convention these features are identified on lunar maps by placing the letter on the side of the crater midpoint that is closest to Burckhardt.

References

External links
 

Impact craters on the Moon